Valesa is the fifth studio album by Norwegian band Major Parkinson. The double album was released on 7 October 2022.

The critical reception to the album has been positive.

Track listing 
 "Goodbye Blue Monday"
 "Behind the Next Door"
 "Saturday Night"
 "Ride in the Whirlwind"
 "Live Forever"
 "Sadlands"
 "Intermezzo"
 "Jonah"
 "Velvet Moon"
 "Irina Margareta"
 "The House"
 "The Room"
 "Posh-Apocalypse"
 "Moma"
 "Lemon Symphony"
 "Fantasia Me Now!"
 "Heroes"

Personnel 
 Major Parkinson

 Jon Ivar Kolbotn – lead vocals, lyrics, songwriting, arrangement
 Eivind Gammersvik – bass, songwriting, production, arrangement, backing vocals
 Lars Christian Bjørknes – piano, synth, songwriting, organs, programming, notation, backing vocals
 Sondre Skollevoll – guitars, backing vocals, additional synths, arrangement, 
 Sondre Sagstad Veland – drums, perc, arrangement, backing vocals
 Øystein Bech-Eriksen – guitars, arrangement
 Claudia Cox: – violin, backing vocals, arrangement

 Additional personnel
 Linn Frøkedal – lead vocals 
 Carmen Boveda – cello
 Peri Winkle – violins 
 Jens Erik Aasmundseth – C64 keyboard percussion 
 Anders Bjelland – Guitars, Downtown Meltdown
 Bjarne Tresnes Sørensen – harmonica 
 Kadeem Nichols – tenor, vocal contractor & choir engineer 
 Porcha Clay, Naarai Jacobs – sopranos 
 Megan Parker, Ashly Williams – altos
 Eric Lynn, Erik Brooks – tenors
 Thea Meidell Sjule, Vilja Kjersheim, Anja Moe – choir

References 

2022 albums
Major Parkinson albums